The Women's 5K race at the 2009 World Championships occurred on Tuesday, 21 July at Ostia Beach in Rome, Italy. In total, 42 Women from 26 countries competed in the race.

Note: The Women's and Men's 5K race at the 2009 Worlds were originally schedule to be held on Sunday, July 19; however, high wind and surf conditions on-course caused the FINA Bureau to postpone the race until July 21.

Results

Key: OTL = Outside time limit, DQ = Disqualified

See also
Open water swimming at the 2007 World Aquatics Championships – Women's 5 km

References

2009 Worlds results: Women's 5K from OmegaTiming.com (official timer of the 2009 Worlds); retrieved 2009-07-21.

World Aquatics Championships
Open water swimming at the 2009 World Aquatics Championships
2009 in women's swimming